Gazi Sohel (born 13 August 1979) is a Bangladeshi cricket umpire.

He has stood as an umpire in matches in the Bangladesh Premier League between 2012 and 2017. He was involved in a few on-field controversial decisions in Dhaka Premier League matches. In November 2018, he was selected in the ICC International Panel of Umpires. In December 2018, he made his debut as an international umpire during the West Indies tour of Bangladesh. In January 2021 he umpired in his first One Day International (ODI) match, between Bangladesh and the West Indies cricket team.

See also
 List of One Day International cricket umpires
 List of Twenty20 International cricket umpires

References

External links
 

1979 births
Living people
Bangladeshi cricket umpires
Bangladeshi One Day International cricket umpires
Bangladeshi Twenty20 International cricket umpires
People from Munshiganj District